Lulin  is a settlement in the administrative district of Gmina Grodzisk Wielkopolski, within Grodzisk Wielkopolski County, Greater Poland Voivodeship, in west-central Poland.

The settlement has a population of 23.

References

Lulin